  

The Dortmund Stadtbahn is a light rail system in the German city of Dortmund and is integrated in the Rhine-Ruhr Stadtbahn network. Its network consists of eight lines and is operated by Dortmunder Stadtwerke, which is operating under the brand DSW21 since 2005.

The light rail system was gradually opened between 1976 and 2008 by relocating the inner-city tram tracks in underground tunnels and opening new express tram routes that are independent of road traffic (e.g. Kirchderne – Grevel). It has 23 underground stations and 59 on the surface.

Network 

The system has eight Stadtbahn lines:

The U41 and U47 rail lines connect with bus 490, which travels to Dortmund Airport.

Rolling stock

See also

 Verkehrsverbund Rhein-Ruhr
 List of rapid transit systems

References

External links

 Dortmund Stadtbahn - official site 
 Dortmund Stadtbahn at urbanrail.net

Transport in Dortmund
Light rail in Germany
Tram transport in Germany
Underground rapid transit in Germany